Spyridon Lambros or Lampros (1851–1919) was a Greek history professor and briefly Prime Minister of Greece during the National Schism.

Biography
He was born in Corfu in 1851 and was educated in London, Paris and Vienna studying history. His father, Pavlos Lambros, was an Aromanian (Vlach) from Kalarrytes in Epirus, meaning he was of Aromanian origin himself.

In 1890, he joined the faculty of the University of Athens and taught history and ancient literature. He became Provost of the university in 1893, serving in that capacity twice, 1893–1894 and 1912–1913.

After 1903, Lambros started an academic movement called Neos Hellenomnemon (Νέος Ἑλληνομνήμων) which studied the scientific and philosophical developments of the Greek-speaking world during the Byzantine and Ottoman eras.

In October 1916 with Greece in the midst of the National Schism and under two governments (Eleftherios Venizelos in Thessaloniki and King Constantine in Athens), the former Liberal and associate of Venizelos accepted the King's commission to form a government in Athens. Eventually,  riots took place in Athens (the Noemvriana), for which Lambros was judged responsible due to mis-management. He resigned as Prime Minister. After the exile of the king in summer 1917, Lambros was put in internal exile by the Venizelists, in Hydra and Skopelos. 

He died in Skopelos on 23 July 1919.

Legacy
His daughter, Lina Tsaldari, was elected to Parliament in 1956 and became the first woman in the Greek Cabinet as Minister of Social Welfare.

Works

 Catalogue of the Greek Manuscripts on Mount Athos (2 vol. set) vol.1, vol.2
 Ecthesis Chronica And Chronicon Athenarum

References

1851 births
1919 deaths
20th-century prime ministers of Greece
Politicians from Corfu
Prime Ministers of Greece
19th-century Greek historians
Academic staff of the National and Kapodistrian University of Athens
Greek people of Aromanian descent